Durio dulcis, known as durian marangang (or merangang), red durian, tutong, or lahung, is a fairly large tree in the genus Durio. It can grow up to 40 m tall. The husk of its fruit is dark red to brown-red, and covered with slender 15–20 mm long spines. The fruit flesh is dark yellow, thin, and deep caramel-flavored, with a turpentine odor. The fruit of this species is considered by many to be the sweetest of all durians.

References

dulcis
Endemic flora of Borneo
Trees of Borneo
Fruits originating in Asia
Vulnerable flora of Asia
Taxa named by Odoardo Beccari
Plants described in 1889